Tassi or Tasso or Tassis is an Italian surname. Notable people with the surname include:

Agostino Tassi (1578–1644), Italian painter
Attila Tassi (born 1999), Hungarian racing driver
Edoardo Tassi (born 1998), Italian football player
Filomena Tassi, Canadian politician
Francesco Maria Tassi (1716–1782), Italian art historian
Lorenzo Tassi (born 1995), Italian footballer
Madonna Tassi, Canadian singer
Matteo Tassi (1831–1895), Italian painter
Maria Aurelia Tasso or Tassis, 18th-century Benedictine nun and writer
Bernardo Tasso
Torquato Tasso
Omodeo Tasso

Italian-language surnames